The Rubik R-23 Gébics was a Hungarian advanced training glider, the first of a series of metal-framed gliders designed by Ernő Rubik, though only one Gébics was built.

Design and development

In 1954 the Central Workshop of the Hungarian Aeronautical Association, Dunakeszi (MRSzE) was required to design and build a single seat training glider with pleasant handling characteristics but the performance to take a novice pilot to their C-certificate. The design team was headed by Ernő Rubik. During its design and construction the management of the Dunakeszi workshops changed along with its name, becoming the Alagi Központi Kisérleti Üzem (AKKÜ) (Central Experimental Plant, Alag) in 1955.  The R-23 Gébics first flew on 13 June 1957.

Structurally, the Gébics was all-metal, largely built from light-alloy members anodized against corrosion though steel tubes were used in highly stressed parts. The two-part wing was rectangular in plan apart from quadrantal tips and was mounted with 3° of dihedral. Behind the spar the wing was fabric-covered. The Gébics had broad-chord Frise-type ailerons occupying about half the span, their gaps increasing outwards.

The fuselage of the Gébics was a largely dural pod-and-boom structure, though the rear fuselage or boom was quite deep and wide. The central structure was a vertical, trapezoidal, U-section frame, its upper part reinforced with welded steel tubes that included attachment points for the wing spar. From its base a box-keel reached forward to the nose, braced by an arched frame which leaned backwards and joined to the vertical frame under the wing. The pilot's seat was mounted on the keel between the vertical and leaning frames under a one-piece, side opening canopy. The underside of the keel carried a landing skid over its full length, with an unsprung, fixed monowheel placed behind the c.g. The boom was a tapering, circular-section, riveted monocoque structure carrying the Gébics' V-tail, which had parallel chord, forward-swept, metal-covered tailplanes  set at 90° to each other. The  control surfaces were fabric-covered. After development flights, these surfaces were extended in length, their forward sweep removed, separations increased to 108° and the control surfaces givene large aerodynamic balances. Below, there was a small tailskid.

The R-24 Bibic (Lapwing) was identical to the Gébics apart from its wing. It used the laminar flow NACA 64618 airfoil, though the wing structure was unchanged. When a government decision closed the AKKU, repurposing its factory, it left the unfinished Bibic abandoned.

Operational history

After its first flight in June 1957 the Gébics was put through a series of comparative tests with the Cinke, a Hungarian post-war revision of the pre-war DFS Olympia Meise. Below about  performances were similar but as speeds rose the superior sinking speed of the Gébics became increasingly significant.

It was then taken to a base in the Mátra mountains chosen for wave lift. Tests showed it to be a stable aircraft with good handling, even in rough air, and difficult to spin. Having demonstrated its suitability for wave lift flights, it stayed in the mountains for a time, investigating techniques for the optimal use of this lift source.

Variants
 R-23 Gébics As described.
 R-24 Bibic As R-23 but Standard Class, with a  span, laminar flow wing. Not completed.

Specifications (R-23 Gébics)

References

Aircraft first flown in 1957
1950s Hungarian sailplanes
High-wing aircraft
V-tail aircraft